Kalyan Jewellers is an Indian chain of jewellery showrooms. 

The company open its initial public offering on March 16, 2021, and was publicly listed on March 26, 2021.

History

The company also has strong roots in the textile trading, distribution and wholesale business.

Initially, Kalyan Jewellers strengthened their presence in the South Indian states of Kerala, Tamil Nadu, Karnataka, Andhra Pradesh and Telangana. In 2012, they expanded outside South India by opening a showroom in Ahmedabad, Gujarat and signed Amitabh Bachchan as their first National Brand Ambassador.

In 2013, Kalyan Jewellers entered International markets by opening six showrooms on the same day in UAE. Since then it has grown to operate 30 showrooms in the Middle East across UAE, Qatar, Kuwait and Oman. As of February, 2020 Kalyan Jewellers has a wide presence of over 137 showrooms, of which 107 are in India and the remaining 30 on the Middle East.

The company has also set up ‘My Kalyan’, a customer service center, offering advance booking for wedding purchases, Kalyan Gold Purchase Advance Scheme, Gold Insurance for gold ornaments, etc. Currently there are over 761 ‘My Kalyan’ outlets in India.

Brand ambassadors

In 2012, Kalyan Jewellers signed Amitabh Bachchan as its first National brand ambassador. Amitabh Bachchan and Jaya Bachchan are the Global brand ambassadors, while their daughter Shweta Bachchan Nanda is the celebrity influencer. Later, Katrina Kaif was also hired to endorse the brand globally in April 2018.

Kalyan Jewellers has also partnered with several leading celebrities to be regional brand ambassadors, including Manju Warrier and Kalyani Priyadarshan in Kerala, Nagarjuna Akkineni in Andhra Pradesh and Telangana, Shiva Rajkumar in Karnataka, Prabhu Ganesan in Tamil Nadu.

In the past, Kalyan Jewellers has been represented by Bollywood celebrities like Sushmita Sen, Aishwarya Rai, and Sonam Kapoor. While Shah Rukh Khan represented them in the Middle East.

Later they also signed several regional brand ambassadors like Pooja Sawant in Maharashtra, Kinjal Rajpriya in Gujarat, Wamiqa Gabbi in Punjab, and Ritabhari Chakraborty in West Bengal.

Criticism
In 2015, Kalyan Jewellers withdrew a controversial advertisement featuring Aishwarya Rai Bachchan after an open letter described it as 'insidiously racist' and huge flak. The company said, "the creative was intended to present royalty, timeless beauty, and elegance".

In 2018, Kalyan Jewellers was embroiled in a controversial commercial starred by Amitabh Bachchan and his daughter Shweta Nanda. The Jewellers have withdrawn the advertisement after being criticized by the All India Bank Officers’ Confederation for allegedly depicting banks negatively. The bankers were threatened court cases, boycott calls and even a dharna against Kalyan Jewellers.

Activities
In March 2020, Kalyan Jewellers released  fund for COVID-19 relief work.

Initial public offering 
On March 11, 2021, Livemint reported that Kalyan Jewellers would be opening an initial public offering worth ₹1,175 crores on 16 March. The company is backed by Warburg Pincus and will offer fresh equity shares worth ₹800 in this debut public issue. It had attempted an IPO earlier but had called it off due to unfavorable market conditions.

It was listed on the National Stock Exchange of India and the Bombay Stock Exchange on March 26, 2021. Its shares are listed at a 15% discount compared to the offer price.

Product lines
Over the years, Kalyan Jewellers has launched various product lines. Some of their jewellery collections are:
Muhurat – Wedding jewellery
Mudhra – Handcrafted antique jewellery 
Nimah – Timeless heritage jewellery 
Anokhi – Uncut diamond jewellery
Rang – Precious stones jewellery
Tejasvi – Polki diamonds jewellery
Ziah – Diamond jewellery collection
Laya – Contemporary gold & diamond jewellery
Glo – Dancing diamond jewellery
Vedha – Heritage jewellery with Uncut diamonds
Apoorva – Diamonds
Hera – Daily wear diamonds

References

Indian brands
Retail companies of Thrissur
Jewellery retailers of India
Indian companies established in 1993
1993 establishments in Kerala
Retail companies established in 1993
Companies listed on the National Stock Exchange of India
Companies listed on the Bombay Stock Exchange
2021 initial public offerings